Bahman Salehnia 
(born March 11, 1939 in Bandar-e Anzali, Iran) is an Iranian football coach. He is currently head-coach of Esteghlal Anzali.

He founded Malavan Sport and Cultural Club and was the manager of its football team for many years. He has won Hazfi Cup on three times with Malavan. Many people call him Father of Malavan.

Career
Malavan (1968-1997)
Iran (1974) (Assist)
Chooka Talesh F.C. (1997-2000)
Malavan (2002-2004)
Esteghlal Anzali (2004-)

External links
  Salehnia's Biography at Malavan official website

Iranian football managers
People from Bandar-e Anzali
1939 births
Living people
Iran national under-20 football team managers
Sportspeople from Gilan province
Malavan F.C. managers